Kotor, or Hrvojev grad ( named after castle's lord), also Kotorgrad , was a medieval fortress above the present settlement of Kotor in Kotor Varoš, Bosnia and Herzegovina, Republic of Srpska entity,  municipality of  Kotor Varoš. During the medieval Kingdom of Bosnia, the fortress is developed to be a first and favorite seat of Hrvoje Vukčić, lord of Donji Kraji, parish Vrbanja, along of other two, Ključ and Jajce.

History
In some recent (2002) sources states that the settlement below the fort called Kotorište, which was never fit the actual situation, because Kotorište, the Kotor Varoš's settlement is on the opposite (right) bank of the Vrbanja river.

In its original form (whose ruins still exist), there was a tower, slightly up the ridge above the Jakotina river, and dungeon (just above the waterfall). The tower and the dungeons were connected with stone staircase, whose broken remains are still visible. In the tower, until the liberation of Kotor Varoš in 1945, a bell of impressive size  existed. Its fate is unknown.

For the first time Kotor was mentioned in 1382. It belonged to Duke Hrvoje Vukčić Hrvatinić (1350-1416). Kotor remained Hrvoje's favourite estate, where he died.

Kotor later became part of the Jajce Banovina, and the Ottomans conquered it in 1519, 52 years after the official fall of Bosnia. Occupying forces to shine down the Vrbanja valley, and the strongest resistance to their further penetration provided by the defense Kotor in Bettle on Večićko field, followed by the Ottomans soon overran and Banja Luka, Srbac, and Kobaš, Derventa and the whole Posavina . Then, briefly crossed in Slavonia .

Timars of Kotor's mustafhiz were even in villages around Visoko, and Visoko's Dubrovnik (probably the main commercial offices). Hamdija Kreševljaković assumes that mustafhiz "in Kotor moved out of a city, which was closer to the Visoko". Until 1838, Kotor had its own crew. During the Austrian occupation of the right bank of the Sava, in Kotor is moved crews and administration Kobaška captaincy, which was under the jurisdiction of the judicial Jajce captaincy. It was noted that 1833 . In Kotor was established only one gun.

Hamdija Kreševljaković  further writes, according to unwritten sources: 

Kreševljaković take Jukić  as the source to the city and fortress of Kotor called Bobas, "and people can still hear "Bobac" If he had left the town of Kotor, learned to be so called waterfall under former bosses and powerful source, one of them more, drinking water. Even in the 1960s, for a Ramadan iftar, water is referred to more remote households Kotor Varoš. The population of Kotor is said to have been the "Bobac", while those from other parts of the city insist  the allegedly "proper" "Bobas".

Research and preservation
The present appearance of the tower and the dungeon is an example of carelessness and neglect important monument of medieval culture, and local authorities will not or do not know how to use them as a valuable and lucrative tourist well.

References

See also
Kotor Varoš
Donji Kraji
Hrvoje Vukčić Hrvatinić

Kingdom of Bosnia
Archaeological sites in Bosnia and Herzegovina
Kotor Varoš
Castles in Bosnia and Herzegovina
National Monuments of Bosnia and Herzegovina
Hrvatinić noble family